The Energy Employees Occupational Illness Compensation Program Act (EEOICPA) was passed by Congress in 2000 and is designed to compensate individuals who worked in nuclear weapons production and as a result of occupational exposures contracted certain illnesses.  EEOICPA was signed into law by President Bill Clinton on October 30, 2000.

Executive Order 13179
Executive Order 13179 states the following:

Program administration
The program is administered by four Federal agencies, and the Department of Labor (DOL) has the primary responsibility for administering the compensation program.

EEOICPA, as amended, has four sections:

 Part A establishes the compensation program.
 Part B covers individuals, or certain survivors of individuals, who worked at a covered facility and have developed beryllium sensitivity, chronic beryllium disease, chronic silicosis, or a radiogenic cancer. Compensation under Part B is a lump sum payment of $150,000, except for eligible individuals who already received payment under Section 5 of the Radiation Exposure Compensation Act (RECA). RECA individuals will only receive a lump sum payment of $50,000.  In addition to the lump sum payment, compensation includes medical benefits from the date an individual files a claim.  
 Part C contains a number of provisions relating to the administration of EEOICPA and its relationship to other Federal and State laws.
 Part D was repealed on October 28, 2004 and replaced with Part E, which is for certain individuals, or certain survivors of individuals, who worked at a Department of Energy facility or a uranium mine or mill and developed any illness that resulted from work-related exposure to toxins.  Compensation under Part E is variable up to $250,000 based on wage loss, impairment, and survivorship.

Facilities that are covered under the Act are determined by DOL and the Department of Energy (DOE).

Radiation dose reconstruction 
For claims filed under Part B for cancers that may have been caused by occupational radiation exposure, DOL sends the claim to the National Institute for Occupational Safety and Health (NIOSH) Division of Compensation Analysis and Support for a radiation dose reconstruction. NIOSH requests the energy employee's individual exposure records from DOE and interviews the claimant or survivors to obtain information to use in the dose reconstruction. NIOSH also collects all relevant data regarding the individual's work site, if available, to complete the dose reconstruction.  Once the dose reconstruction is complete, NIOSH sends the dose reconstruction back to DOL and DOL makes compensation decisions.

All other Part B claims and all Part E claims remain at DOL for review and compensation determinations.

Implementation 
In July 2001, nine Energy Employee Compensation Resource Centers were opened as a joint initiative of Departments of Labor and Energy. They were staffed and resourced to assist workers and their families with the lodgement of claims. The Department of Energy was to provide exposure data and work documentation.  There are currently eleven Resource Centers.

Status of claims 
As of 15 September 2019, EEOICP has provided $16,910,292,048 in compensation and medical bill payments to sick workers and their families.

As of 12 January 2023, EEOICP has provided $22,618,631,449 in compensation and medical bill payments to sick workers and their families, and represent a cohort of 136,515 unique workers.

See also
David Michaels (epidemiologist)
Nuclear labor issues
Radiation Exposure Compensation Act
Compensation scheme for radiation-linked diseases (United Kingdom)

References

Occupational safety and health
National Institute for Occupational Safety and Health
Nuclear history of the United States
Nuclear weapons of the United States
United States Department of Energy
United States Department of Labor